Cameron Jamel Thomas (born December 12, 1986) is an American football nose tackle who is a free agent.  He was drafted by the San Diego Chargers in the fifth round of the 2010 NFL Draft. He played college football at North Carolina. Thomas has also been a member of the Pittsburgh Steelers, and Los Angeles Rams.

Professional career
Thomas was considered one of the top defensive tackle prospects for the 2010 NFL Draft.

San Diego Chargers
Thomas was selected by the San Diego Chargers in the fifth round (146th overall) of the 2010 NFL Draft. During his rookie season in 2010, Thomas played 6 games and has 2 sacks on 7 tackles. In 2011, he played all 16 games with 2 starts making 19 tackles with 4 sacks. In 2012, he played 16 games with 21 tackles. In 2013, he played 16 games with 26 tackles and an interception. He became a free agent after the 2013 season.

Pittsburgh Steelers
Thomas signed with the Pittsburgh Steelers on March 14, 2014. During his first season with Pittsburgh in 2014, he played in all 16 regular season games, recording 19 tackles (11 solo) and half a sack. In the Steelers' opening round playoff game against the Baltimore Ravens, Thomas assisted on one tackle.

In 2015, he played in 15 regular season games, recording 11 tackles (9 solo). In the Steelers' first playoff game against the Cincinnati Bengals, he assisted on one tackle and recovered an A. J. McCarron fumble, returning it for 11 yards. The turnover would help lead the Steelers to a Chris Boswell field goal in a game they eventually won 18-16. Thomas would also play in the Steelers' second playoff game against the Denver Broncos.

Los Angeles Rams
On June 6, 2016, Thomas along with Dylan Thompson, Benson Browne, and Terrence Magee signed contracts with the Los Angeles Rams. On September 3, 2016, he was released by the Rams as part of final roster cuts. Three days after his release, he re-signed with the Rams.

Kansas City Chiefs
On June 8, 2017, Thomas signed with the Kansas City Chiefs. He was released on September 2, 2017. On November 13, 2017, Thomas re-signed with the Chiefs. He was released on November 23, 2017.

Northern Arizona Wranglers
On October 10, 2020, it was announced that Thomas had signed with the Northern Arizona Wranglers of the Indoor Football League (IFL) for the team's inaugural 2021 season. Thomas became a free agent following the 2021 season.

References

External links
Pittsburgh Steelers bio
San Diego Chargers bio
Los Angeles Rams bio
North Carolina Tar Heels bio

1986 births
Living people
People from Moore County, North Carolina
Players of American football from North Carolina
American football defensive tackles
North Carolina Tar Heels football players
San Diego Chargers players
Pittsburgh Steelers players
Los Angeles Rams players
Kansas City Chiefs players